James Dowdell may refer to:

 James Ferguson Dowdell (1818–1871), U.S. politician
 James R. Dowdell (1847–1921), U.S. jurist